Maccabiah may refer to:

 Maccabiah Games, a quadrennial international Jewish and Israeli multi-sport competition
 Maccabiah Games by year held
 Maccabiah sports, the sports played at the Maccabiah Games
 Maccabiah Stadium

See also
 Maccabees (disambiguation)
 Maccabeus (disambiguation)
 Maccabi (disambiguation)